William Gardiner may refer to:

Politicians
William Gardiner (MP died 1558) (1522–1558), English MP for Barnstaple
William Gardiner (MP for Helston) (1531–1597), English MP for Helston and Lostwithiel
William Gardiner (British Army officer) (1748–1806), last British minister in Poland before its Third (and final) Partition
William Gardiner (Wisconsin politician) (1826–?), farmer and member of the Wisconsin State Assembly in 1879
William Tudor Gardiner (1892–1953), American politician and Governor of Maine
Sir William Gardiner, 1st Baronet (1628–1691), English politician

Others
William Gardiner (mathematician) (died 1752), English mathematician
William Gardiner (English composer) (1770–1853), English composer
William Gardiner (botanist) (1808-1852), Scottish poet-botanist and umbrella maker
William H. Gardiner (1861–1935), photographer
William Gardiner (clergyman) (1867–1941), twice tried for the Peasenhall Murder
William Guthrie Gardiner (died 1935), businessman and philanthropist
William Gardiner (Australian composer) (born 1986), Australian composer
William Gardiner (cricketer) (1864–1924), New Zealand cricketer
William Nelson Gardiner (1766–1814), Irish engraver and bookseller

See also
William Gairdner (disambiguation)
William Gardner (disambiguation)